Percy Brandt (7 November 1922 – 4 December 2005) was a Swedish film and television actor.

Brandt was born in Lahore, Punjab, Pakistan. His father, Erik Brandt, was a Swede of German and Dutch ancestry, and his mother, Aminah Hussain, was Pakistani.

Brandt's daughter, Paula Brandt, is also an actress.

External links

TCM Biography

1922 births
2005 deaths
Swedish male film actors
Swedish male television actors
Swedish people of German descent
Swedish people of Dutch descent
Swedish people of Pakistani descent
Male actors from Lahore
People from Lahore